Rosephanye Powell, pronounced ro-SEH-fuh-nee, (born 1962) is an American choral composer, singer, professor, and researcher.

Rosephanye Dunn Powell has been hailed as one of America's premier composers of choral music. She has a diverse and impressive catalogue of works published by some of the nation's leading publishers, including the Hal Leonard Corporation, the Fred Bock Music Company/Gentry Publications, Oxford University Press and Alliance Music Publications. Her compositions include sacred and secular works for mixed chorus, women's chorus, men's chorus, and children's voices. Her style of composition has been characterized by beautiful melodies, strong rhythmic emphasis, rich harmonies often derived from African-American popular styles, and varied vocal textures including counterpoint. Her influences include African-American musical styles; the choral works of J.S. Bach, G.F. Handel, Mozart and Verdi; the art songs of William Grant Still, Undine Smith Moore, Fernando Obradors, Samuel Barber, Emmanuel Chabrier; and the spiritual arrangements of H.T. Burleigh, J. Rosamond Johnson, William Dawson, Hall Johnson, Lena McLin, and Roland Carter. Powell's works are popular throughout the world, especially in Europe and Asia.  She is in constant demand as a composer-in-residence, clinician, adjudicator, conductor, and performer.

Life
Rosephanye Dunn Powell, born in Lanett, Alabama, studied piano, played the saxophone and sang in choirs as a child. As a high school student, she excelled in track and basketball, played saxophone in the marching band, and performed lead roles in theatrical productions.  Powell graduated from West Point High School (West Point, GA) in 1980 and was the class valedictorian. She received a basketball scholarship to Alabama State University but soon realized that she could not play basketball and pursue a music degree.  Powell graduated summa cum laude from Alabama State University with a Bachelor of Music Education degree, vocal emphasis (1984); with distinction from Westminster Choir College with a master's degree in vocal performance and pedagogy (1987); and from The Florida State University as a University Fellow with a Doctor of Music degree in vocal performance(1993).

Prior to accepting her present position as Professor of Voice at Auburn University, Powell taught at Philander Smith College (1993-2001) and Georgia Southern University (1987-1990). She is married to choral conductor and arranger William C. Powell and has two daughters: Camille Elise and Kaitlyn Elizabeth.  Many of Powell's original works are arranged for different voicings by her husband who has a number of published choral works of his own.

Prior to her career as a composer, Powell invested most of her energy performing art song and lecture recitals dedicated to the works of William Grant Still, dean of African-American composers, and the interpretation of African-American spirituals. Because of her research and performances, Powell is considered an authority on both of these subjects.  Her articles have been published by prestigious academic journals as the NATS Journal (National Association of Teachers of Singing) and the ACDA Journal.  Powell served as editor and wrote the introduction for the anthology William Grant Still: An Art Song Collection. For a period, she had a weekly radio segment Living History on the nationally syndicated The Donnie McClurkin Show where Powell provided the listening audience with brief moments in Black music and history.

In 2012  Powell's first multi-movement sacred work for chorus, organ and orchestra, "The Cry of Jeremiah," commissioned by the American Guild of Organists, was premiered with great success on July 5, in Nashville, TN.   In 2011, Powell and her husband served as editors of Spirituals for Upper Voices, a collection of twelve spirituals arranged for treble voices, published by Oxford University Press, London. In 2010, Powell's multimovement work (six songs) entitled Christmas Give was a centerpiece for the CD "Christmas at America's First Cathedral," released by Gothic Records and featuring the Baltimore Choral Arts and orchestra at the Baltimore Basilica, Tom Hall, director. In 2009, Powell was presented with the Living Legend Award at the California State University African Diaspora Sacred Music Festival in Los Angeles. She was listed in the first edition of the international publication Who Is Who in Choral Music; and has been included in Who's Who Among America's Teachers and Outstanding Young Women in America.

Works
Powell composes secular and sacred works for mixed chorus, men and women's chorus and children's voices. Selected published works include:

The Cry of Jeremiah (four songs for SATB chorus, organ and orchestra with narration), 2012
1. Is Not His Word Like A Fire; 2. O Lord, You Have Deceived Me; 3. Cursed Be the Day; 4. Hallelujah!
Spirituals for Upper Voices (twelve songs for arranged for treble voices. editor, with William C. Powell), 2011
Down by the Riverside SSATB and piano (2011)
Christmas Give, suite of six songs for SATB chorus, soloist, and orchestra (2010) Each published separately and in different years.
1. Have You Seen the Baby Jesus (a cappella); 2. Christmas Memories; 3. Ring the Bells; 4. Holy Night; 5. Ogo ni fun Oluwa (African percussion); 6. Christus Natus Est (text by Harlem Renaissance poet Countee Cullen) 
Be Glad in the Lord SATB a cappella (2009)
Solidaridad SATB accompanied, Spanish song (2008)
Hope Come True, a suite of songs for SSAA and SATB (2008) Each published separately and in different years.
1. In Dat Great Giddin' Up Mo'nin (SATB a cappella); 2. Hope Come True (SSAA); 3. Keep Yo' Lamps (SSAA); 4. To Sit and Dream (text by Langston Hughes,  
Rejoice!, for chorus, organ, trumpets, and timpani (2007)
He Is Marvelous SATB 2007
Glory Hallelujah To Duh Newborn King SATB a cappella Christmas (2007)
As the Deer Pants SSAA accompanied (2006)
Ev'ry Time I Feel the Spirit, SSAA, arranged for The Sofia Chamber Choir "Vassil Arnaudov"- Bulgaria, Southeastern Europe (2006)
Gwendete two-part, African (2006)
Come Unto Me All Ye That Labour (2006)
Children of the Rainbow, children's choir (2005)
Pete, Pete for treble voices and piano and African drums (2005)
Sicut Cervus for women's voices; composed for the 25th Anniversary of the Texas Collegiate Women's Choral Festival, (2004)
Still I Rise SSAA (2005)
Sometimes I Feel like a Motherless Child SATB a cappella (2003)
Sing Unto The Lord SATB a cappella (2003)
Good News! SSAA a cappella (2003)
Drinkin' of the Wine SATB a cappella (2002)
Sorida SATB a cappella and African percussion (2002)
Non Nobis Domine SATB, SSAA, TTBB (2002)
GloriaSAB accompanied, (2002)
I Dream A World SATB accompanied (2002)
I Want to Die While You Love Me SSAA accompanied (2016)
The Promise Lives On SATB (from Sing for the Cure) (2000)
Wade in the Water SATB a cappella (2000)
Come Let's Celebrate SATB Christmas (2000)
Grumble Too Much TTBB/SSAA (2000)
Three Psalms of David (2000)
1. O God, You Are My God; 2. Make Haste, O God; 3.The Righteous Cry Out
Kingston Market 3-part Treble (1999)
Ascribe to the Lord SATB, SSAA, TTBB (1998,2001)
Wait On The Lord SATB a cappella (1997)
The Word Was God SATB a cappella (1996)
I Wanna Be Ready SATB, SSAA (1996/2004)
Kingston Market Treble voices, children (year?)

Her music has been recorded and issued on CD, including:
Motherless Child (Rosephanye Powell)
Christmas at America's First Cathedral (Baltimore Choral Arts and Orchestra)
We Who Make Our Meaning Clear (MUSE:  Cincinnati's Women's Choir)
REFLECTIONS: Portraits from the Life of Christ (Oasis Chorale)
Still I Rise (Vox Femina)

Powell has published professional articles on music topics, including:
"Keeping the Choir", Showchoir
"William Grant Still: His Life and His Songs", NATS Journal of Singing
"The African-American Spiritual: Preparation and Performance Considerations", NATS Journal of Singing

References

1962 births
Living people
20th-century classical composers
African-American women classical composers
American music educators
American women music educators
American women classical composers
African-American classical composers
American classical composers
People from Lanett, Alabama
Alabama State University alumni
Westminster Choir College alumni
Florida State University alumni
Philander Smith College faculty
Georgia Southern University faculty
Auburn University faculty
20th-century American women musicians
21st-century classical composers
21st-century American composers
21st-century American women musicians
20th-century American composers
20th-century women composers
21st-century women composers
American women academics
African-American women musicians
20th-century African-American women
20th-century African-American musicians
21st-century African-American women
21st-century African-American musicians